Speicher may refer to:

Speicher (surname)
Speicher, Switzerland in Appenzell Ausserrhoden.
Speicher, Germany in the district Bitburg-Prüm, Rhineland-Palatinate
Speicher (Verbandsgemeinde), a collective municipality in Bitburg-Prüm, Rhineland-Palatinate, Germany
Speicher massacre, second deadliest act of terrorism in history
Camp Speicher, an airfield in Iraq